Death Row Records Presents... Tha Dogg: Best of the Works is the second greatest hits album by Snoop Dogg, released by Death Row Records on December 9, 2003. According to its import code of Brasil AA3000 it was pressed for one shipment of 3000 in Brazil. No other sales data are known.

Track listing

References

2003 greatest hits albums
Albums produced by Daz Dillinger
Albums produced by DJ Pooh
Albums produced by Dr. Dre
Snoop Dogg compilation albums
Death Row Records compilation albums
Gangsta rap compilation albums
G-funk compilation albums